"The Next Day" is a single by English rock musician David Bowie, from his 25th studio album, The Next Day. The song caused controversy before the single's release due to its perceived mocking of Christianity, which some Christians considered obscene.

It was released as a white-square-shaped vinyl 45, as a 'limited' edition release. Both sides featured the track. The single reached 179 on the UK Singles Chart.

Music video
The music video debuted on 8 May 2013. It was directed by Floria Sigismondi, who also directed the video for the preceding single, "The Stars (Are Out Tonight)", and features English actor Gary Oldman and French actress Marion Cotillard, along with David Bowie. The video depicts Bowie performing in a bar called The Decameron—reference to the Boccaccio's work of that name known also for its satirical depiction of clergymen—and populated with religious figures and half-naked women. The video also portrays Marion Cotillard's character (who is presumed to be a prostitute) suffering from gruesome stigmata, with the detailed depiction of the blood bursting from her wounds, while the priest is dancing with her. Other horror elements such as eyeballs served as food are also present. The music video ends with the stigmatized woman apparently born again as an innocent girl and Bowie saying simply, "Thank you Gary, thank you Marion, thank you everybody." Bowie then disappears.

Controversy

The video gained wide attention and caused a controversy. It was banned from YouTube just two hours after its release due to "violation of YouTube's Terms of Service." However, the video returned on the website shortly after its removal, with an age restriction. A YouTube spokeswoman stated: "With the massive volume of videos on our site, sometimes we make the wrong call. When it's brought to our attention that a video has been removed mistakenly, we act quickly to reinstate it."

The video also triggered many backlashes and criticisms from various Christian organizations. Bill Donohue, the leader of the Catholic League for Religious and Civil Rights, heavily criticized it and David Bowie, calling the video "a mess" and referring to Bowie as "a switch-hitting, bisexual, senior citizen from London". The former archbishop of Canterbury, George Carey, also criticized the song as "juvenile" and urged other Christians to "rise above." He also stated that he doubted whether Bowie would have the courage to use Islamic imagery." Also, Andrea Williams of Christian Concern questioned the point of the video while Jack Volero of Catholic Voices referred to it as "desperate".

As a reaction to the controversy and Donohue's criticisms, Bowie's official website issued a response, titled "The Next Day the day after". The writing contains an explicit response to the depiction of "the served eyeballs", which is acknowledged to be a reference to Saint Lucy.

Personnel
According to Chris O'Leary:

David Bowie – lead and backing vocal, electric guitar, string arrangement
David Torn – guitar
Gerry Leonard – guitar
Gail Ann Dorsey – bass guitar
Zachary Alford – drums, percussion
Antoine Silverman – violin
Maxim Boston – violin
Hiroko Taguchi – viola
Anja Wood – cello
Tony Visconti – string arrangement

Technical
David Bowie – producer
Tony Visconti – producer, engineer
Mario J. McNulty – engineer

Chart performance
In Flanders, "The Next Day" reached #53 on the Ultratip in 2013.

References

Sources

External links
 The Next Day, the day after (davidbowie.com) 
  (official video)

David Bowie songs
Music videos directed by Floria Sigismondi
Music video controversies
Obscenity controversies in music
Religious controversies in music
Online obscenity controversies
Christianity in popular culture controversies
2013 singles
Columbia Records singles
2013 songs
Song recordings produced by Tony Visconti
Songs written by David Bowie
Songs critical of religion
British hard rock songs
YouTube controversies